Khalifa Airways was a passenger and cargo airline based in Algiers, Algeria which was founded in June 1999 by Rafik Khalifa and ceased flying in 2003. The airline served internal routes within Algeria, along with international services in Africa, Europe and the Middle East.

History 
A Boeing 737-400 was leased from Pegasus Airlines late that year. In 2001, Khalifa Airways ordered  Airbus A340-300 aircraft, along with  A330-200s and  A320s, scheduled for delivery in 2004.

The airline was liquidated by a French court on 10 July 2003 after it failed to make a €5 million payment to creditors.

Khalifa Airways is also known for having been the sponsor of Olympique de Marseille from 2001 to 2003.

On March 22, 2007, the International Herald Tribune reported that the company's founder had been convicted in absentia and sentenced to life in prison for his involvement in the 2003 failure of Khalifa Bank and associated companies, including Khalifa Airways.

Services 

Khalifa Airways served the following destinations throughout its history:

Algeria
Algiers
Adrar
Annaba
Batna
Bejar
Bejaia
Constantine
El Oued
Ghardaia
Jijel
Hassi Messaoud
Tamanrasset
Tbessa
Tiaret
Tindouf
Tlemcen 
France
Lyon
Marseille
Toulouse
Spain
Alicante
Barcelona
Palma de Mallorca

Fleet
Khalifa Airways operated the following equipment throughout its history:

Airbus A300-600F
Airbus A310-300
Airbus A319-100
Airbus A320-200
Airbus A330-300
Airbus A340-300
ATR 42-300
ATR 72-500
Boeing 737-400
Boeing 737-800
Bombardier Challenger 604

See also
List of airlines of Algeria
Transport in Algeria

References

External links

  at Wayback Machine

Defunct airlines of Algeria
Airlines established in 1999
Airlines disestablished in 2003
1999 establishments in Algeria
2003 disestablishments in Algeria